Simushir, meaning Large Island in Ainu, is an uninhabited volcanic island near the center of the Kuril Islands chain in the Sea of Okhotsk in the northwest Pacific Ocean. It was formerly known as Marikan.

History
At the time of European contact, Simushir was inhabited by the Ainu. The island appears on an official map showing the territories of Matsumae Domain, a feudal domain of Edo period Japan dated 1644, and these holdings were officially confirmed by the Tokugawa shogunate in 1715. Russian explorer Gerasim Izmailov was marooned on Simushir in the early 1770s. He spent a full year subsisting on "scallops, grass, and roots". Sovereignty initially passed to Russia under the terms of the Treaty of Shimoda, but was returned to the Empire of Japan per the Treaty of Saint Petersburg along with the rest of the Kuril islands. The island was formerly administered as part of Shimushiru District of Nemuro Subprefecture of Hokkaidō. Settlers on the island were engaged in fishing, and the raising of Arctic fox and reindeer. During World War II, the civilian population was evacuated to the Japanese home islands and Simushir was garrisoned by a detachment from the Imperial Japanese Army. It was surrendered to Soviet forces during the Battle of the Kuril Islands without resistance.

Under the Soviet Union, Brouton Bay was used by the Soviet Navy as a secret submarine base between 1987 and 1994, and had a population of approximately 3000 people. The remains of the base can be seen clearly on satellite images.

Today the island is uninhabited. It is now administered as part of the Sakhalin Oblast of the Russian Federation.

Geology
Simushir is highly elongated, consisting of a series of stratovolcanos. At the north end of the island is a half-submerged caldera, Brouton Bay, with an entrance only 2.5 meters deep, plunging to 240 meters in the center.

Further south are:
The peak erupted in the early 19th century, forming a symmetrical cone with a resemblance to Mount Fuji. On the summit is a 450 × 600 meter wide summit crater with a small caldera lake on its floor. Lava flows from the summit reach both coasts of central Simushir. Only two eruptions are known from Prevo Peak in historical times. The largest of these, during the 1760s, produced pyroclastic flows that destroyed all vegetation at the foot of the volcano. Weak explosive activity occurred during the most recent eruption, in the early 19th century.
Several young cones and lava domes are located near the margins the lake. A lava dome created in the 1916 and 1931 eruptions formed a small island in the northern part of the lake. In 1957, a new 350 meter wide, 40 meter high lava dome was created following explosive eruptions, decreasing the size of the lake.
This volcano erupted in 1881 and in 1914. The outer flanks of the steep-sided mountain are dissected by deep gullies, with lava flows extending to the sea. The three kilometer wide caldera was breached to the south due to glaciations.
This volcano erupted in 1881 and in 1914.

Climate
In spite of its temperate latitude, the powerful Oyashio Current on the western flank of the Aleutian Low gives Simushir a chilly and very wet subarctic climate (Köppen Dfc) that amazingly almost qualifies as a polar climate (ET), which in low-lying areas would be expected only at latitudes about 20 degrees or  further north. Summers are mild, but extraordinarily cloudy with fogs occurring on six-sevenths of all days in summer and annual sunshine hours less than 1,100 per year, which is comparable to Reykjavík or the extremely foggy Sichuan Basin. Sunshine is actually most likely in the wettest months of September and October when the heavy rain removes the low-level fog, but clear days are extremely rare at any time of year.

Fauna
In the spring crested and least auklet, Leach's storm petrel, and Japanese cormorant nest on the island.

See also
 List of volcanoes in Russia
 List of islands of Russia

Notes

References
 Gorshkov, G. S. Volcanism and the Upper Mantle Investigations in the Kurile Island Arc. Monographs in geoscience. New York: Plenum Press, 1970. 
 Krasheninnikov, Stepan Petrovich, and James Greive. The History of Kamtschatka and the Kurilski Islands, with the Countries Adjacent. Chicago: Quadrangle Books, 1963.
 Rees, David. The Soviet Seizure of the Kuriles. New York: Praeger, 1985. 
 Takahashi, Hideki, and Masahiro Ōhara. Biodiversity and Biogeography of the Kuril Islands and Sakhalin. Bulletin of the Hokkaido University Museum, no. 2-. Sapporo, Japan: Hokkaido University Museum, 2004.

External links

 
 
 
 
 
 Simushir submarine base

 
Islands of the Sea of Okhotsk
Islands of the Russian Far East
Stratovolcanoes of Russia
Islands of the Kuril Islands
Volcanoes of the Kuril Islands
Uninhabited islands of Russia
Uninhabited islands of the Pacific Ocean
Calderas of Russia
Mountains of the Kuril Islands
Russian and Soviet Navy submarine bases